Fallon, California is an unincorporated community in Marin County, California Just west of State Route 1 along the abandoned North Pacific Coast Railroad.

Geography 

Demographics 
Fallon has not been included in past Census counts, so there is no population information for this community. However estimated population varies from 15 to 25 residents.

History 

The name Fallon honors Luke and James Fallon, early local settlers. Starting in the 1870s, Fallon was a stop on the North Pacific Coast Railroad connecting Cazadero to the Sausalito ferry to San Francisco. Following soon after in 1898 the first post office in Fallon opened.

Improvements to the narrow-gauge rail corridor continued in the 1910s and although it is generally thought that tracks north of Point Reyes Station (milepost 36.4) remained 3 ft (914 mm) narrow gauge; it is plausible that dual-gauge tracks were installed as far as Monte Rio (milepost 73.8) serving passenger and industry needs alike in and around Fallon until the entire lines abandonment in the 1930s.

References

Unincorporated communities in California
Unincorporated communities in Marin County, California